Xerolirion is a monotypic genus of perennial herbs in the family Asparagaceae, subfamily Lomandroideae. The only known species is Xerolirion divaricata, commonly known as Basil's asparagus, from Western Australia .

Both genus and species were first described by Alex George in 1986.

References

Lomandroideae
Monotypic Asparagaceae genera
Asparagales of Australia
Taxa named by Alex George
Plants described in 1986